Michel Raison (born November 5, 1949 in Besançon, Doubs) was a member of the National Assembly of France from 2007 to 2012.  He represented the Haute-Saône department,  and is a member of the Union for a Popular Movement.
In septembre 2014, he became senator in the upper house for the Haute-Saône department.

References

1949 births
Living people
Politicians from Besançon
Union for a Popular Movement politicians
United Republic politicians
Deputies of the 12th National Assembly of the French Fifth Republic
Deputies of the 13th National Assembly of the French Fifth Republic
Senators of Haute-Saône